The Meridian Mets were a Mississippi State League (1921) and Cotton States League (1922-1923; 1925-1929) baseball team based in Meridian, Mississippi, United States. Multiple major leaguers played for the team.

References

Baseball teams established in 1921
Baseball teams disestablished in 1929
Defunct minor league baseball teams
1921 establishments in Mississippi
1929 disestablishments in Mississippi
Defunct baseball teams in Mississippi
Defunct Cotton States League teams